The 1993–94 LEN European Cup was the 31st edition of LEN's premier competition for men's water polo clubs.

Quarter-finals

|}

Semi-finals

|}

Finals

See also
1993–94 LEN Cup Winners' Cup
1993–94 LEN Cup

External links 

LEN Champions League seasons
1993 in water polo
1994 in water polo